Wu Hsiao-lin (born 4 February 1995) is a badminton player from Taiwan. In 2012, he won the silver medal at the Asian Junior Championships in the boys' doubles event partnered with Wang Chi-lin. Teamed-up with Lin Chia-yu, they reach the Vietnam Open finals. They failed to win the title after being beaten by the Indonesian pair in three sets. He and Lin won the men's doubles title at the Malaysia International tournament in 2014 and 2015. They also won the 2015 USA International tournament in the men's doubles event.

Achievements

Asian Junior Championships 
Boys' doubles

BWF Grand Prix 
The BWF Grand Prix has two levels, the BWF Grand Prix and Grand Prix Gold. It is a series of badminton tournaments sanctioned by the Badminton World Federation (BWF) since 2007.

Men's doubles

  BWF Grand Prix Gold tournament
  BWF Grand Prix tournament

BWF International Challenge/Series 
Men's doubles

  BWF International Challenge tournament
  BWF International Series tournament
  BWF Future Series tournament

References

External links 
 

1995 births
Living people
Sportspeople from Kaohsiung
Taiwanese male badminton players